Asterius of Caesarea was a Roman senator, who became a Christian martyr. After Asterius gave a Christian burial to a Roman soldier Marinus of Caesarea, who suffered martyrdom, he too was condemned to martyrdom, and was beheaded.

Both saints have their feast day commemorated on March 3 in Catholicism.

References

262 deaths
Saints from the Holy Land
3rd-century Christian martyrs
Year of birth unknown